Kula (also Romanized as Kūlā; also known as Kolā) is a village in Kolah Boz-e Sharqi Rural District, in the Central District of Meyaneh County, East Azerbaijan Province, Iran. At the 2006 census, its population was 274, in 46 families.

References 

Populated places in Meyaneh County